South of the River is the name of many places, usually in an urban region:
In the UK city of London, it is the name for South London which is south of the River Thames
In the US state of Minnesota, it is the name for suburbs south of the Minnesota River in Minneapolis-St. Paul including most of Burnsville, Eagan, Apple Valley, Savage, Prior Lake in Dakota County
In Perth, Western Australia, it refers to suburbs south of the Swan River
In Leeds, It is the name for the South Leeds suburbs and districts that are south of the River Aire such as Beeston, Hunslet, Morley and Middleton